The Maccabi Men's Challenger was a professional tennis tournament played on outdoor hard courts. It was part of the ATP Challenger Tour. It was held at the Maccabi Tennis Club in Melbourne, Australia, in 2009.

Past finals

Singles

Doubles

2013 Melbourne Challenger
The 2013 Melbourne Challenger was a professional tennis tournament played on outdoor hard court. It was the first edition of the tournament which was part of the 2013 ATP Challenger Tour. It took place in Melbourne, Australia between 21 and 27 October 2013.

Past finals

Singles

Doubles

External links
Tennis Australia official website
ITF search

ATP Challenger Tour
Hard court tennis tournaments
Tennis tournaments in Australia